Alexandre Lochakoff was a Russian-born art director. After fleeing following the Russian Revolution in 1917 he settled in France where he worked designing film sets.

Selected filmography
 Heart of an Actress (1924)
 Michel Strogoff (1926)
 Napoleon (1927)
 Secrets of the Orient (1928)
 The White Devil (1930)
 Sergeant X (1932)
 Port Arthur (1936)
 The Red Dancer (1937)
 Nights of Princes (1938)
 After Midnight (1938)
 The Patriot (1938)

References

Bibliography
 Alastair Phillips. City of Darkness, City of Light: Émigré Filmmakers in Paris, 1929-1939. Amsterdam University Press, 2004.

External links

Year of birth unknown
Year of death unknown
Russian art directors
French art directors
People who emigrated to escape Bolshevism
Emigrants from the Russian Empire to France